In mathematics, the grand Riemann hypothesis is a generalisation of the Riemann hypothesis and generalized Riemann hypothesis. It states that the nontrivial zeros of all automorphic L-functions lie on the critical line  with  a real number variable and  the imaginary unit.

The modified grand Riemann hypothesis is the assertion that the nontrivial zeros of all automorphic L-functions lie on the critical line or the real line.

Notes 
 Robert Langlands, in his general functoriality conjectures, asserts that all global L-functions should be automorphic.
 The Siegel zero, conjectured not to exist, is a possible real zero of a Dirichlet L-series, rather near s = 1.
 L-functions of Maass cusp forms can have trivial zeros which are off the real line.

References

Further reading
 

Zeta and L-functions
Conjectures
Unsolved problems in mathematics
Bernhard Riemann